The 1979–80 Minnesota Golden Gophers men's basketball team represented the University of Minnesota as a member of the Big Ten Conference during the 1979–80 NCAA Division I men's basketball season. Led by head coach Jim Dutcher, the Gophers played their home games at Williams Arena in Minneapolis.

Minnesota finished tied for fourth in the rugged Big Ten Conference (Indiana and Ohio State were top 10 teams throughout the season while Iowa and Purdue reached the Final Four) with a record of 10–8, but were left out of the 48-team NCAA Tournament. The Gophers went on to reach the championship game of the 1980 NIT, where they fell to Virginia and college legend Ralph Sampson,  and finished with an overall record of 21–11.

Senior forward Kevin McHale finished his career as the school-record holder in blocks while also establishing the single-season record (surpassed three seasons later by teammate Randy Breuer). He finished second on the career scoring and rebounding charts. McHale was taken by the Boston Celtics with the No. 3 pick in the 1980 NBA draft.

Roster

Schedule and results

|-
!colspan=9 style=| Non-Conference Regular Season

|-
!colspan=9 style=| Big Ten Conference Regular Season

|-
!colspan=9 style=| National Invitation Tournament

Team players in the 1980 NBA Draft

References

Minnesota Golden Gophers men's basketball seasons
Minnesota
Minnesota
1979 in sports in Minnesota
1980 in sports in Minnesota